Australia competed at the 2011 Commonwealth Youth Games in Isle of Man from 7 to 13 September 2011. Australian Commonwealth Games Association selected 77 contingents for seven different sports. Australia won total 74 medals (including 29 gold), and finished at the second spot in a medal table.

References

Nations at the 2011 Commonwealth Youth Games
Commonwealth Youth Games